The 2019 Thai Women's League was the fifth season of the Thai Women's League, the top Thai professional league for women's association football clubs, since its establishment in 2009. A total of 11 teams competed in the league.  The season began on 26 January 2019.

Teams
 Air Force
 Bangkok
 BG Bundit Asia
 Chonburi
 Kasem Bundit University
 Lampang Sports School
 Nakhon Si Lady
 Sisaket Sports School
 Thailand U-16
 Thailand U-19
 Thammasat University

Format

The league is divided into 2 rounds. The first round is divided into 2 groups, 6 teams, with the Thailand U-16 in the group as a stand.
For Group B, there are 5 teams in Thailand. Thailand U-19 is a standing team, if any team with the top 2 highest scores of each group Will go through to play in the final

Personnel and sponsoring
Note: Flags indicate national team as has been defined under FIFA eligibility rules. Players may hold more than one non-FIFA nationality.

Groups

League table

Group A

Source=FA Thailand

Round 1

Round 2

Round 3

Round 4

Round 5

Round 6

Round 7

Round 8

Round 9

Round 10

Round 11

Round 12

Round 13

Round 14

Round 15

Round 16

Group B

Source=FA Thailand

Round 1

Round 2

Round 3

Round 4

Round 5

Round 6

Round 7

Round 8

Round 9

Round 10

Round 11

Round 12

Round 13

Round 14

Bracket

Semi-final

Third place play-off

Third Place shared

Final

Winners shared
Because if an athlete still competes in the same women's league football program There may be a risk that will affect the national team athletes. In the most important list of 2019 FIFA Women's World Cup

Season statistics

Top goalscorers

References

External links

2017
Thailand
Thailand
2019 in Thai football leagues